Philidris cordata is a species of ant in the genus Philidris. Described by Smith in 1859, the species is endemic to Indonesia and New Guinea. This species is a frequent inhabitant of the ant plant genera: Myrmecodia and Hydnophytum.

References

Dolichoderinae
Insects described in 1859
Hymenoptera of Asia
Insects of Indonesia
Insects of New Guinea